WCET may refer to:
 Worst-case execution time, a computer science term
 WCET (TV), a PBS station serving the Cincinnati area
 Wireless Communication Engineering Technologies Certification, an IEEE certification regarding wireless technologies
 Western Cooperative for Educational Telecommunications